Vangelis Kefalas (born 31 July 1973) is a retired Greek football defender.

References

1973 births
Living people
Greek footballers
Apollon Smyrnis F.C. players
AEK Athens F.C. players
Kavala F.C. players
Kalamata F.C. players
Panachaiki F.C. players
Panserraikos F.C. players
PAS Giannina F.C. players
Trikala F.C. players
Asteras Tripolis F.C. players
Agios Dimitrios F.C. players
A.O. Nea Ionia F.C. players
Super League Greece players
Association football defenders
Greece under-21 international footballers